Otrus, or Otrous, was a town of ancient Phrygia located in the Phrygian Pentapolis, inhabited during Roman and Byzantine times. 

It was the seat of a bishop, a notable bishop was Zoticus of Otrous. No longer a residential bishopric, it remains a titular see of the Roman Catholic Church.

Its site is located near Yanık Ören in Asiatic Turkey.

References

Populated places in Phrygia
Former populated places in Turkey
Roman towns and cities in Turkey
Populated places of the Byzantine Empire
History of Afyonkarahisar Province
Catholic titular sees in Asia
Sandıklı District